Nuki may refer to:

 2053 Nuki, a minor planet
 Nuki (joinery), a type of Japanese carpentry joint 
 Paul Nuki, a medical journalist 
 Nuki (smart lock), a smart lock, produced by an eponymous Austrian company.